Kenneth Aaron Pettway (born November 13, 1982) is a former American gridiron football player. He played in the National Football League and the American Football League from 2005 to 2012.

Pettway played college football for the Grambling State University Tigers. He was drafted into the NFL by the Houston Texans in the seventh round of the 2005 NFL Draft. He played for the Jacksonville Jaguars from 2006–2007 and Green Bay Packers in 2008 and then shifted to the CFL, where he played for the Edmonton Eskimos in 2010 and the Calgary Stampeders in 2012.

Early life
Pettway was born in Houston, Texas. He attended Gilmer High School in Gilmer, Texas and was a letterwinner in football, basketball, and track. After attending Southern Arkansas University (whose Muleriders team was in NCAA Division II), he transferred to Grambling State University in 2002 and sat out the season pursuant to NCAA transfer rules. He played for the Grambling State Tigers football team in 2003 and 2004.

Professional career

Houston Texans
Pettway was drafted by the Houston Texans in the seventh round (227th overall) of the 2005 NFL Draft. He spent most of his rookie season on the team's practice squad before being promoted to the active roster on December 9. He was inactive for the team's final three regular season contests. An exclusive-rights free agent in the 2006 offseason, Pettway re-signed with the Texans on March 27. He was released by the team during final cuts on September 1.

Jacksonville Jaguars
Following his release from the Texans, Pettway was signed to the practice squad of the Jacksonville Jaguars on October 18, 2006. He was promoted to the active roster on November 8 and went on to play in the seven games for the Jaguars during the 2006 season, registering two sacks in limited action. He was released by the Jaguars during final cuts on August 30, 2008.

Green Bay Packers
Pettway was signed by the Green Bay Packers on September 30, 2008 after defensive end Cullen Jenkins was placed on injured reserve. He was signed over free agent defensive end Patrick Chukwurah, who also worked out for the Packers following Jenkins' injury. The Tennessee Titans and Pittsburgh Steelers reportedly showed interest in working out Pettway prior to his signing with Green Bay.

Pettway appeared in eight games for the Packers in 2008, recording four tackles. He was placed on season-ending injured reserve with a knee injury on December 1. He was released by the Packers on April 6, 2009.

Edmonton Eskimos
Pettway was signed by the Edmonton Eskimos of the Canadian Football League in 2010. He made his first start against the Montreal Alouettes, replacing an injured Greg Peach. He was released by the Eskimos on May 16, 2011.

Calgary Stampeders
Pettway was signed by the Calgary Stampeders on June 18, 2012. He was released by the Stampeders on January 30, 2013.

Personal life
On September 2, 2008, Pettway was in a car with his former Jaguars teammate Richard Collier when Collier was shot 14 times, leaving him with life-threatening and career-ending injuries. Pettway was unharmed.

References

External links
Just Sports Stats
Jacksonville Jaguars bio
Calgary Stampeders bio

1982 births
Living people
American football defensive ends
American football linebackers
Edmonton Elks players
Calgary Stampeders players
Grambling State Tigers football players
Green Bay Packers players
Houston Texans players
Jacksonville Jaguars players
Players of American football from Houston
Players of Canadian football from Houston
Southern Arkansas Muleriders football players